Arlington House may refer to:

Arlington House, The Robert E. Lee Memorial
Arlington House (London) a hostel for the homeless in London, England, and one of the Rowton Houses
Arlington House, Margate, an eighteen-storey residential apartment block in Margate, Kent, England
Arlington House in London, the demolished home of Henry Bennet, 1st Earl of Arlington on the site of Buckingham Palace
Arlington House Publishers, a now-defunct American book publisher that published jazz discographies, as well as conservative, anti-communist titles
Arlington Beach House, one of the first hotels built in Saskatchewan and was one of the first buildings constructed along Last Mountain Lake
Arlington Historic House, a former plantation house near downtown Birmingham, Alabama called Arlington Antebellum Home & Gardens